The following is a list of Teen Choice Award winners and nominees for Choice Music – Single. This category was split into three categories; Choice Music Single – Male, Choice Music Single – Female and Choice Music Single – Group from 2012 and onward. Britney Spears is the youngest winner in 1999 at the age of 17.

Winners and nominees

1999

2000s

2010s

References

Single